The Sheffield Tower is a 46-floor tower in the Jumeirah Lake Towers Free Zone in Dubai, United Arab Emirates. Construction of The Sheffield Tower was expected to be completed in 2009.

See also 
 Fortune Araames
 List of tallest buildings in Dubai

External links
Emporis

Skyscraper office buildings in Dubai